Aporophobia (from the Spanish aporofobia, and this from the Ancient Greek ἄπορος (áporos), 'without resources, indigent, poor,' and φόβος (phobos), 'hatred' or 'aversion') are negative attitudes and feelings towards poverty and poor people. It is the disgust and hostility toward poor people, those without resources or who are helpless.

The word povertyism is also used, in the field of international law, to specify this form of discrimination against people living in poverty. 

The concept of aporophobia was coined in the 1990s by the philosopher Adela Cortina, professor of Ethics and Political Philosophy at the University of Valencia, to differentiate this attitude from xenophobia, which only refers to the rejection of foreigners, and racism, which is discrimination by ethnic groups. The difference between aporophobia and xenophobia or racism is that socially there is no discrimination or marginalization of immigrants or members of other ethnic groups when these people have assets, economic resources and/or social and media relevance.

After a decision of French Parliament on the 24 of June of 2016, it was added to the list of discriminations forbidden by the constitution as "discrimination for social precarity". However it noted that fewer than 20 persons instituted lawsuits due to a such discrimination.

See also

References

Bibliography 

 Cortina, Adela (2017). Aporofobia, el rechazo al pobre. Barcelona: Paidós. .

Class discrimination
Phobias
Poverty
Xenophobia